Gods and Monsters is the debut studio album of Gary Lucas, released in 1992 through Enemy Records.

Track listing

Personnel 
Musicians
Gary Lucas – vocals, guitar, production
Rolo McGinty – vocals
Jared Nickerson – bass guitar
Tony Thunder Smith – drums
Production and additional personnel
John Azelvandre – engineering
Michael Blair – drums on "Jack Johnson/Ghostrider", percussion on "Whip Named Lash"
Harold Burgon – engineering
Johnny Byrne – engineering
Stephen Byrum – art direction, design
Greg Calbi – mastering
Anton Corbijn – photography
K-Rob – vocals on "The Crazy Ray"
Jon Langford – vocals and guitar on "The Brain from Planet Eros"
Keith Leblanc – drums on "King Strong", programming
Tony Maimone – bass guitar on "The Brain from Planet Eros"
Francis Manzella – engineering
Skip McDonald – engineering
Paul Now – sampler, bass guitar on "The Crazy Ray" and "King Strong"
Mary Margaret O'Hara – vocals on "Poison Tree"
Chuck Valle – engineering

References 

 

1992 albums
Gary Lucas albums
Enemy Records albums